Gabi Packer is a former Israeli footballer who is mostly known for playing in Maccabi Netanya for 14 seasons.

Honours
Championships
Runner-up (1): 1987–88
Toto Cup
Runner-up (2): 1986–87, 1988–89
Second Division
Winner (1): 1998–99
Runner-up (1): 1996-97

References

1969 births
Living people
Israeli Jews
Israeli footballers
Maccabi Netanya F.C. players
Maccabi Petah Tikva F.C. players
Maccabi Ironi Ashdod F.C. players
Hapoel Tzafririm Holon F.C. players
Footballers from Netanya
Liga Leumit players
Association football defenders